The Salmon Bay Bridge, also known as Bridge No. 4, is a Strauss Heel-trunnion single-leaf bascule bridge spanning across Salmon Bay and connecting Magnolia/Interbay to Ballard in Seattle, Washington. The bridge is located just west of Commodore Park. It carries the main line of the BNSF Railway, the Scenic Subdivision, on its way north to Everett and south to King Street Station and Seattle's Industrial District.

The Salmon Bay Bridge, which is located west of the Hiram M. Chittenden Locks, is the last bridge to span the Lake Washington Ship Canal before it becomes Puget Sound. Additionally, vessel clearance when lowered is 13.1 meters (43 feet) at mean high tide, and up to 15.3 meters (50 feet) at low tide.

BNSF Railway initially planned to replace the Salmon Bay Bridge with a new vertical-lift bridge, but chose to repair failing components of the existing bridge following consultation with the local community.

References

External links 

Essay on the bridge by Greg Pierce

Bridges in Seattle
Bascule bridges in the United States
BNSF Railway bridges
Railroad bridges in Washington (state)
Bridges completed in 1914
Great Northern Railway (U.S.) bridges
1914 establishments in Washington (state)
Steel bridges in the United States